The Riftwar Cycle is the name given to the series of books authored or co-authored by Raymond E. Feist that revolve around the fantasy worlds of Midkemia and Kelewan.

The Riftwar Universe
The majority of Feist's works are part of The Riftwar Universe, and feature the worlds of Midkemia and Kelewan.  Human magicians and other creatures on the two planets are able to create rifts through dimensionless space that can connect planets in different solar systems.  The novels and short stories of The Riftwar Universe record the adventures of various people on these worlds.

Midkemia was originally created as an alternative to the Dungeons and Dragons (D&D) role-playing game. When Feist studied at the University of California, San Diego, he and his friends created a new role-playing game based on their own original world of Midkemia. They called themselves the Thursday Nighters, because they played the Midkemia role-playing game every Thursday evening. After some time, when the group changed and began meeting on Fridays, they became known as the Friday Nighters.  The original group have since formed a company called Midkemia Press, which has continued publishing campaigns set in that universe.

Feist acknowledges that the Tekumel setting from M. A. R. Barker's Empire of the Petal Throne was the source for much of Kelewan. The original D&D campaign which he based his books on had an invasion of the Midkemia world by Tekumel. As a result, much of the background of Kelewan - the Tsurani Empire, the lack of metals and horses, the Cho'ja, the pantheons of 10 major and 10 minor gods - comes from Tekumel. Feist claims to have been unaware of this origin when he wrote Magician.

Works

Most Riftwar novels' stories occur in chronological order following the publishing order, with a few exceptions. The Empire Trilogy starts during Magician and concludes after A Darkness at Sethanon. The Riftwar Legacy occurs between the Riftwar Saga and Krondor's Sons. The Legends of the Riftwar novels occur between Magician and Silverthorn.

Novels are grouped into their respective series, with series ordered by the publishing date of the first novel in the series.

The Riftwar Saga

 Magician (1982), later republished in two parts in the United States as Magician: Apprentice (1986) and Magician: Master (1986)
 Silverthorn (1985)
 A Darkness at Sethanon (1986)

The Empire Trilogy

 Daughter of the Empire (1987) with Janny Wurts
 Servant of the Empire (1990) with Janny Wurts
 Mistress of the Empire (1992) with Janny Wurts

Krondor's Sons

 Prince of the Blood (1989)
 The King's Buccaneer (1992)

The Serpentwar Saga

 Shadow of a Dark Queen (1994)
 Rise of a Merchant Prince (1995)
 Rage of a Demon King (1997)
 Shards of a Broken Crown (1998)

The Riftwar Legacy

 Krondor: The Betrayal (1998)
 Krondor: The Assassins (1999)
 Krondor: Tear of the Gods (2000)
 Jimmy and the Crawler (2013) - a novella replacing the cancelled novels Krondor: The Crawler and Krondor: The Dark Mage.

Legends of the Riftwar

 Honoured Enemy (2001) with William R. Forstchen
 Murder in LaMut (2002) with Joel Rosenberg
 Jimmy the Hand (2003) with S. M. Stirling

Conclave of Shadows

 Talon of the Silver Hawk (2002)
 King of Foxes (2003)
 Exile's Return (2004)

The Darkwar Saga

 Flight of the Nighthawks (2005)
 Into a Dark Realm (2006)
 Wrath of a Mad God (2008)

The Demonwar Saga

 Rides a Dread Legion (2009)
 At the Gates of Darkness (2010)

The Chaoswar Saga

 A Kingdom Besieged (2011)
 A Crown Imperiled (2012)
 Magician's End (2013)

Short stories
Profit and the Grey Assassin (1982) in Fantasy Book (Journal)
The Wood Boy (1998) in Legends
The Messenger (short story) (2003) in Legends II

Other media 
On February 2, 2022, Six Studios, a production company started by Jeff Huang and Carl Choi, announced it would develop the first six books in The Riftwar Saga into a TV series. Hannah Friedman, Jacob Pinion and Nick Bernardone are attached to write.

References

High fantasy novels
Works by Raymond E. Feist